Balatonederics is a small resort town next to Lake Balaton in Hungary. It was first mentioned in 1262. The Roman Catholic Church in the village dates from that time, although its neogothic exterior is from 1870.

In Balatonederics an Africa Museum and zoo can be visited. It was founded Endre Nagy in 1984 and houses hunting trophies and ethnographic artefacts from Tanzania.

In the 19th and 20th centuries, a small Jewish community lived in the village, in 1880 65 Jews lived in the village, most of whom were murdered in the Holocaust. The community had a Jewish cemetery.

What to see in Balatonederics

 Stalactite cave
 Lake Balaton biggest golf course 
 Beautiful beach
 Wine region
 Very old Palace

References

External links 
 African museum and zoo
 Balatonederics Cave 
 Street map (Hungarian)
 Tourism portal + Pictures of Balatonederics

Gallery 

Populated places in Veszprém County
Jewish communities destroyed in the Holocaust